The Journal of Ecclesiastical History is a quarterly peer-reviewed academic journal published by Cambridge University Press. It was established in 1950 and covers all aspects of the history of the Christian Church. It deals with the church both as an institution and in its relations with other religions and society at large. The journal publishes articles and book reviews.

The current editors-in-chief are Alec Ryrie (Durham University) and James Carleton Paget (University of Cambridge). The journal is regarded as highly authoritative in its field, and is compared to the American Church History.

References

External links 

1950 establishments in the United Kingdom
Cambridge University Press academic journals
English-language journals
Journals about ancient Christianity
Publications established in 1950
Quarterly journals